William or Bill Sparks may refer to:

Bill Sparks (1922–2002), British soldier in World War II
William A. J. Sparks (1828–1904), U.S. Representative from Illinois
William J. Sparks (1905–1976), Exxon chemist and president of the American Chemical Society
William Morris Sparks (1872–1950), U.S. federal judge
William Henry Sparks (1800–1882), American lawyer and poet